John Quarre was a Welsh Anglican priest in the 16th century.

Langley was  educated at Merton College, Oxford. He was Archdeacon of Llandaff from 1529 until 1540.

Notes

16th-century Welsh Anglican priests
Archdeacons of Llandaff
Alumni of Merton College, Oxford